Gary Reed is the name of:

 Gary Reed (comics) (1956–2016), US comic book writer and publisher
 Gary Reed (athlete) (born 1981), Canadian middle-distance runner

See also
Gary Reid (1960), New Zealand rower